Overhangs are the lengths of a road vehicle which extend beyond the wheelbase at the front and rear.  They are normally described as front overhang and rear overhang.  Practicality, style, and performance are affected by the size and weight of overhangs.

Characterization
Along with clearance, length of overhangs affects the approach and departure angles, which measure the vehicle's ability to overcome steep obstacles and rough terrain. The longer the front overhang, the smaller is the approach angle, and thus lesser the car's ability to climb or descend steep ramps without damaging the front bumpers. Typically, the rear overhang is larger on rear-wheel drive cars, while the front overhang is larger on front-wheel drive cars.

Overhangs in the case of rolling stock are the lengths from the bogie pivots to the ends of the car, or in the case of two axles the distances outside of the wheelbase to the ends of the car.

Because most vehicles are styled so the wheelbase is typically equal to four wheel+tyre diameters, the minimum OHR (with no bodywork projecting beyond the front or rear wheels) is approximately 20%.

Advantages
Large overhangs contribute to large vehicle dimensions, and the associated advantages of size.  On front-engined saloon/sedans, measuring rear overhang is helpful in predicting the size of the trunk.  For these same vehicles, large front overhangs can accommodate larger engines. Large overhangs also contribute to safety due to increased bulk, as well as space for crumple zones that provide defense for passengers in frontal and rear collisions. 

The Porsche 911, produced since 1964, has always contained its entire flat-6 engine within its rear overhang, with the center of mass of the engine outside of the wheelbase. In the case of the 911, the rear-mounted engine allows for increased practicality in the form of a small rear row of seats that would be impossible with a mid-engined sports car.

Disadvantages
Excessive weight that is concentrated outside of the wheelbase can interfere with accurate negotiation of corners at high speed.  The rear-engined Porsche 911, with its engine far in the rear, was notorious for dangerous oversteer in its early days, and cars with engines far in the front often suffered from the opposite problem of understeer, for which many old American cars with heavy V8 engines were infamous.  Front-engined Ferraris, such as the Ferrari 612 Scaglietti place their engines within the wheelbase, so as to avoid the problem of understeer. Reducing overhanging weight in sports cars is usually a priority, with the notable exception of the 911.

In contrast, the excellent handling of the Mini, with its wheels pushed far out at each corner, can be partly credited to its small overhang. The classic Mini and New MINI are both automobiles with very little overhang and thus handle very well under extreme conditions. The minimal overhang gives the Mini its bulldog-like stance.

Rear overhang may present a problem in large vehicles such as buses. Long rear overhang would require the driver to pay attention to nearby vehicles when turning at 90 degrees. Since the rear overhang is outside the wheelbase, it may hit a vehicle in the adjacent lane, especially when turning 90 degrees right (in a right-hand drive country).

Also, some specialized vehicles (such as the AM General HMMWV and the related Hummer H1) are designed with no frontal overhang, allowing it to possess incredible abilities such as climbing vertical walls. This does, however, place these vehicles' front wheels as the furthest forward point of the vehicle, which can lead to disastrous results in the event of a frontal collision.

See also 

 Approach and departure angles
 Cantilever
 Idler flatcar
 Minimum railway curve radius
 Ride height
 Turning diameter
 Wheelbase

References

External links
Ideal handling characteristics

Vehicle design